The 2017 Men's Pan American Cup was the fifth edition of the Men's Pan American Cup, the quadrennial men's international field hockey championship of the Americas organized by the Pan American Hockey Federation. It was held between 4 and 12 August 2017 in Lancaster, Pennsylvania, United States, simultaneously with the women's tournament.

The tournament doubled as the qualifier for two major international tournaments: the winner qualified directly to the 2018 World Cup, and the two teams not qualifying through the 2018 South American Games or the 2018 Central American and Caribbean Games qualified for the 2019 Pan American Games in Lima, Peru. Also, the top 6 teams qualified for the next Pan American Cup, while the bottom two need to compete in the Pan American Challenge.

Argentina won the tournament for the third time after defeating Canada 2–0 in the final. As they had already secured an automatic berth at the 2018 World Cup thanks to a second-place finish at the World League Semifinal in London, England, their quota was immediately awarded to first reserve team New Zealand.

Qualification
The top six nations at the 2013 Pan American Cup qualified directly with the remaining two spots were assigned to the first and second-placed team at the 2015 Pan American Challenge, which was held in Chiclayo, Peru.

Results
All times are Eastern Daylight Time, (UTC−04:00)

First round

Pool A

Pool B

Fifth to eighth place classification

5–8th place semi-finals

Seventh place game

Fifth place game

First to fourth place classification

Semi-finals

Third place game

Final

Statistics

Final standings

Awards

See also
2017 Women's Pan American Cup

References

External links
Official website

 
Men's Pan American Cup
Qualification tournaments for the 2019 Pan American Games
International field hockey competitions hosted by the United States
Sports in Lancaster, Pennsylvania
Pan American Cup
Men's Pan American Cup
Pan American Cup Men
Pan American Cup